General Khamtai Siphandone (born 8 February 1924) is a Laotian politician who was Chairman of the Lao People's Revolutionary Party from 24 November 1992 to 21 March 2006 and President of Laos from 24 February 1998 to 8 June 2006, when he was replaced by Choummaly Sayasone. He was a member of the Communist Party of Indochina in 1954 and a member of the Central Committee of the Lao People's Revolutionary Party in 1956.

Early life
Siphandone comes from a peasant family from the far south of Laos. His first job was as a postman. He joined the national liberation movement Lao Issara after the end of the Second World War,  which stood for the independence of Laos and against the return of the French protectorate administration. Before the French regained control of Savannakhet in March 1946, Siphandone seized the entire provincial fund (150,000 piastres). He became an officer of the armed wing of the movement and in 1948 their representative for southern Laos. After the split of Lao Issara in 1950 he joined the Viet Minh-backed Pathet Lao.

In 1954 he became a member of the Communist Party of Indochina, and in 1955 the Lao People's Party, whose central committee he was from 1957. He was considered a close confidant of the first Secretary-General Kaysone Phomvihane. In 1962 he became his successor as chief of staff of the armed units of the Pathet Lao. In 1966 he became commander-in-chief of the resulting "Lao People's Liberation Army", which fought with North Vietnamese support in the Laotian civil war against the royal troops. In 1972 he rose to the Politburo of the LPRP.

Political career
After the Communist takeover in 1975, he became Minister of Defence and Deputy Chairman of the Council of Ministers. He held this office for 16 years. After Kaysone and [Nouhak Phoumsavanh ]]he was from the 5th party congress in 1991 number three in the party leadership. On 15 August 1991, he became Kaysone's successor as Prime Minister of Laos. After the death of longtime party leader Kaysone in 1992, Siphandone rose to the top of the party.

He was the military commander of the Pathet Lao rebellion. On its takeover of the Laotian government in 1975 he became minister of defence, commander of the army, and a deputy prime minister. On the creation of chairmanship of LPRP q the in 1991, he became prime minister, succeeding party leader Kaysone Phomvihane, who became president. Siphandone became party leader on Kaysone's death, and succeeded Nouhak Phoumsavanh as president in 1998. At the 8th Party Congress in 2006, he became an Advisor to the LPRP Central Committee.

Siphandone remained as party leader until 21 March 2006, when he was replaced by Choummaly. As expected, he stepped down as President soon after the 30 April 2006, National Assembly elections.

References

|-

|-

|-

|-

|-

1924 births
Living people
Heads of the Central Committee of the Lao People's Revolutionary Party
Members of the 1st Central Committee of the Lao People's Party
Members of the 2nd Central Committee of the Lao People's Revolutionary Party
Members of the 3rd Central Committee of the Lao People's Revolutionary Party
Members of the 4th Central Committee of the Lao People's Revolutionary Party
Members of the 5th Central Committee of the Lao People's Revolutionary Party
Members of the 6th Central Committee of the Lao People's Revolutionary Party
Members of the 7th Central Committee of the Lao People's Revolutionary Party
Members of the 2nd Politburo of the Lao People's Revolutionary Party
Members of the 3rd Politburo of the Lao People's Revolutionary Party
Members of the 4th Politburo of the Lao People's Revolutionary Party
Members of the 5th Politburo of the Lao People's Revolutionary Party
Members of the 6th Politburo of the Lao People's Revolutionary Party
Members of the 7th Politburo of the Lao People's Revolutionary Party
Members of the 3rd Secretariat of the Lao People's Revolutionary Party
Members of the 4th Secretariat of the Lao People's Revolutionary Party
Lao People's Revolutionary Party politicians
Presidents of Laos
Prime Ministers of Laos
Deputy Prime Ministers of Laos
Laotian military leaders